Anneka Svenska (born Anne Caroline Barrett; 26 January 1974) is a British presenter, actress, journalist and wildlife conservationist.

Svenska gained media attention when she fronted the Channel 5 show OutTHERE, since 2013, she has hosted several conservationist events, including the YouTube channel Animal Watch which explores the nature and history of various animals. Svenska, a passionate animal rights activist, specialises in wolf and canine behaviour.

Svenska is the founder of Green World TV and is a patron of the World Animal Day.

References

Living people
21st-century British actresses
British women television presenters
British conservationists
1974 births